Aminata Diarra (born 24 February 1970) is a Malian sprinter. She competed in the women's 100 metres at the 1988 Summer Olympics.

References

External links
 

1970 births
Living people
Athletes (track and field) at the 1988 Summer Olympics
Malian female sprinters
Olympic athletes of Mali
Place of birth missing (living people)
Olympic female sprinters
21st-century Malian people